Upper Arlington City School District is a public school district in the U.S. state of Ohio. It serves the entire city of Upper Arlington, Ohio in Franklin County.

High school
Upper Arlington High School

Middle schools
There are two middle schools in Upper Arlington:
Hastings Middle School
Jones Middle School

Elementary schools
Barrington Elementary School
Greensview Elementary School
Tremont Elementary School
Wickliffe Progressive Community School
Windermere Elementary School

Other schools
Burbank Early Childhood School

References

External links
Upper Arlington City School District Official Website

School districts in Ohio
Upper Arlington, Ohio
Education in Franklin County, Ohio